Percy James Brazier (born 3 August 1903; died 30 November 1989) was an Anglican Assistant Bishop of Uganda in the mid 20th century.

Brazier was educated at Weymouth College; Emmanuel College, Cambridge; and Ridley Hall, Cambridge. and ordained deacon in 1927 and priest in 1928.He was a Curate at St John the Evangelist, Blackheath until 1930 when he went out to Kabale as a CMS missionary. He was Archdeacon of Ruanda-Urundi from 1946 to 1951; Assistant Bishop of Uganda for Ruanda-Urundi from 1951 to 1960; and Bishop of Rwanda and Burundi from 1960 until his retirement in 1964.

References 

1903 births
Anglican bishops of Rwanda and Burundi
Anglican assistant bishops of Uganda
20th-century Anglican bishops in Uganda
1989 deaths
Alumni of Ridley Hall, Cambridge
Alumni of Emmanuel College, Cambridge
People educated at Weymouth College (public school)
British expatriate bishops